The First Battle of Jaunde involved the attempted British and French assault on the German capital of Jaunde during the Kamerun campaign of the First World War. Due to a lack of coordination, difficult terrain, adverse weather conditions, and stiff German resistance, the attack was forced to retreat in late June 1915. Another assault on the capital would not be conducted until later that year.

References
 Burg, David F., and L. Edward. Purcell. Almanac of World War I. Lexington, KY: University of Kentucky, 1998.
 Dane, Edmund. British Campaigns in Africa and the Pacific, 1914-1918,. London: Hodder and Stoughton, 1919.
  O'Neill, Herbert C. The War in Africa and the Far East. London: London Longmans Green, 1918.
 Strachan, Hew. The First World War. Vol. I: To Arms. Oxford: Oxford University Press, 2001.

Battles of World War I involving Germany
Battles of World War I involving France
Battles of World War I involving the United Kingdom
African theatre of World War I
Battles of the African Theatre (World War I)
Military history of Cameroon
Kamerun
Battles of the Kamerun campaign
Conflicts in 1915
1915 in Africa
May 1915 events
June 1915 events
1910s in Kamerun